Kouvola is a city and municipality in southeastern Finland. With Kotka, Kouvola is one of the capital centers and is the largest city in the Kymenlaakso region.

Kouvola is bordered by the municipalities of Hamina, Heinola, Iitti, Kotka, Lapinjärvi, Loviisa, Luumäki, Miehikkälä, Mäntyharju, Pyhtää and Savitaipale. Kouvola has over 450 lakes and, together with Mäntyharju, the Kouvola area includes the Repovesi National Park.

Kouvola, which had population growth as late as the 1980s, has suffered a loss of migration since the 1990s. Over time, the loss has only deepened, so that at the end of the 2010s Kouvola was Finland's worst migration loss area. Natural demographics have also trended downward; in 2017, more than 450 more people died in the city than new ones were born. The reasons for the emigration are thought to be largely due to job losses in the region.

History 

The village of Kouvola has been inhabited since the Middle Ages, and it has belonged alternately to the churches of Hollola, Iitti and Valkeala. However, the actual development did not start until the 1870s when the Riihimäki–Saint Petersburg line was built and Kouvola became a railway junction. Kouvola railroad built Kymin mill founder Axel Wilhelm Wahren railway administration by on application, on the basis of the track engineers decided to recommend the creation of a fifth-end position in a half mile east of the variable alert Otava with acceptance on sandy soil on fabric. In the next decade, the Savonia railway was built from Kouvola to the north and the Kotka line to the south, resulting in Kouvola becoming one of the busiest railway junctions in Finland. Over time, Kouvola developed into an important pulp-producing, paper-milling and printing centre and even had a leading industrial engineering sector.

In 1918, conflict between the Red and White factions raged heavily during the Finnish Civil War. More than 200 people were killed in the area during the fighting.

As a result of the railway, Kouvola was heavily built. In 1922 it was separated from the municipality of Valkeala and gained commercial rights immediately the following year. The city of Kouvola was established in 1960. Kouvola was annexed to Vyborg Province in 1922-1945 but in 1940 and 1944, most of Vyborg County was ceded to the Soviet Union, and the remaining areas were formed into Kymi Province in 1945. Kouvola had also become an administrative center; As the capital of Kymen County, it operated from 1955 until the 1997 county reform.

In January 2009, the six municipalities of Kouvola, Kuusankoski, Elimäki, Anjalankoski, Valkeala and Jaala were consolidated, forming the new municipality of Kouvola. Kouvola has also assumed the slogan Kymijoen kaupunki (the town of Kymijoki) previously used by Anjalankoski.

Culture 
The name itself derives from Old Finnish kouvo, meaning bear and wolf. The arms are Sable, an escarbuncle Or, base wavy Argent.
 Verla factory, which is a UNESCO World Heritage Site, is located near Kouvola.
 The newspapers Kouvolan Sanomat and Keskilaakso are published in Kouvola.
 The third biggest Amusement park in Finland, called Tykkimäki is located in Kouvola.

Province History of Kouvola 
  Viipuri Province (1922–1945)
  Kymi Province (1945–1997)
  Southern Finland Province (1997–2009)
  Kymenlaakso (2009-)

Sports 
Kouvola is the hometown of the Sudet sports club, which became Finnish champions in bandy six consecutive times, and they have a football team which is playing at the fourth highest level, Kolmonen, despite Sudet being one of the oldest football clubs in Finland. KooKoo is the most successful ice hockey team in Kymenlaakso. It plays in the Finnish top league, SM-liiga. Kouvolan Pallonlyöjät (KPL) is a baseball team based in Kouvola and known for Pesäpallo. KPL was won five Finnish championships and it plays in the Finnish top league, Superpesis. Kouvot is a basketball team based in Kouvola. the team plays in the highest level Korisliiga and has won four Finnish championships.

MyPa is one of the most successful football clubs in Finland and the 1990s was the golden era. MyPa is played 23 seasons in the Finnish top football league Veikkausliiga. MyPa are based in the industrial village of Myllykoski, part of the city of Kouvola. The club became inactive in professional football after having ceased operations in 2015 due to financial difficulties. In 2017, MyPa returned and started again from the fourth highest tier but has quickly risen to the second highest level, Ykkönen, where it is now playing.
Kouvola also has a Palomäki Ski Jump Center, very close to the city, where young people and other sports enthusiasts can go to jump on a ski jump.

Local government

Climate 
Like its western neighbour city Lahti, Kouvola lies just between the two climate zones, humid continental climate (Dfb) and a subarctic climate (Dfc). Summers are generally relatively warm as the city is considered to be one of the hottest cities in Finland as it has had the most days with "helle" (temperatures above 25 °C) since 2000. Winters are cold and long, colder than cities located in the coastal areas of Finland because of its location further inland, meaning the marine effect doesn't affect the city as much than those nearer the sea and specially those nearer the southwestern coasts of the Finnish side of Gulf of Finland. This too means that the summers are warmer due to it being further inland as the sea effect is making the summer temperatures slightly cooler in coastal areas. The average annual temperature is 4.4 °C. The highest ever recorded temperature in the station was 34.1  (93.4 °F), on July 28, 2010. The lowest ever recorded was -37.3 °C (-35.1 °F). The city has a significant rainfall throughout the year and even in the driest month the precipitation stays over 30 mm a month. The average snow depth ranges from 40 to 50 centimetres on winters.

International relations

Twin towns and sister cities
Kouvola is twinned with:
Balatonfüred,  Veszprém County, 
Vologda,  Vologda Oblast, 
Mülheim an der Ruhr,  North Rhine-Westphalia,

Regionalization

Jaala is only one does not form its own regional committee, but is part of the Kuusankoski regional committee.

Notable people

Atso Askonen (Former ice hockey player)
Arto Bryggare (Former hurdling athlete)
Timo Susi (Former ice hockey player)
Jarkko A. Immonen (Current ice hockey player)
Jari Lindström (Finnish politician)
Kaarle Viikate (Finnish musician and metal band Founder of the Viikate)
Juhani Aaltonen (Jazz saxophonist and flautist)
Roope Tonteri (Finnish snowboarder)
Hannu Salama (Finnish author)
Ari Koivunen (Heavy metal singer)
Ville Nousiainen (cross-country skier)
Toni Gardemeister (Professional rally driver)
Niilo Halonen (Former ski jumper)
Timo Lahti (Speedway rider)
Aleksanteri Hakaniemi (singer and YouTuber)

Gallery

References

External links 

The official website of Kouvola
Kouvola Tourist Office

h2g2.com on Kouvola

 
Populated places established in 1922
Cities and towns in Finland
Climate